Seth McBride (born 1983) is an American Paralympic wheelchair rugby player and five-time gold medalist from Seattle, Washington.

Early life
Born in Juneau, Alaska, McBride graduated from Juneau-Douglas High School in 2001. During the same year he got into a skiing accident which left him paralyzed and with two broken vertebrates in his neck. After his accident he began to attend the University of Oregon from which he got a degree in international studies in 2005.

Career
The same year he participated at the Tribute to Peace World Wheelchair and Amputee Games in Rio de Janeiro and since then and until 2006 has won numerous of gold medals at the IWAS World Games, North American and Canada Cups and also at the world championships. However, at the 2008 North American Cup he won silver. But that didn't stop him from winning gold and by 2010 he earned three more. In 2012 he won his first bronze medal at the 2012 Summer Paralympics in London during which he and his team scored 64–48 against Japan's Daisuke Ikesake.

Personal life
In his spare time he plays harmonica, rides a bike and travels to El Salvador where he teaches English. Currently he attends Portland State University where he pursuing master's degree in non-fiction writing.

References

1983 births
Living people
Paralympic wheelchair rugby players of the United States
Paralympic gold medalists for the United States
Paralympic bronze medalists for the United States
American wheelchair rugby players
Sportspeople from Seattle
Portland State University alumni
University of Oregon alumni
Wheelchair rugby players at the 2008 Summer Paralympics
Wheelchair rugby players at the 2012 Summer Paralympics
Medalists at the 2008 Summer Paralympics
Medalists at the 2012 Summer Paralympics
Paralympic medalists in wheelchair rugby
People from Juneau, Alaska
Sportspeople from Alaska